Caius (or Gaius) was Bishop of Milan in early 3rd-century. He is honoured as a Saint in the Catholic Church and his feast day is on September 27.

Life
Almost nothing is known about the life and the episcopate of Caius, except that he was bishop of Milan in early 3rd-century, that he died on the 26 September and that his corpse was allegedly buried in a cemetery in the area of the Basilica Naboriana, now demolished. His relics were later translated into the near Basilica of Sant'Ambrogio.

Middle age texts, such as the Historia Dataria dated 11th-century, add biographic details which are to be considered legendary, such as his presence in Rome at the martyrdom of Saint Peter and Saint Paul and the conversion by him of Saints Vitalis, Valeris and Gervasius and Protasius.

Notes

Archbishops of Milan
3rd-century Christian saints
Saints from Roman Italy